Kurgan Oblast (Kurganskaya oblast) is a federal subject of Russia (an oblast). Its administrative center is the city of Kurgan. In June 2014, the population was estimated to be 874,100, down from 910,807 recorded in the 2010 Census.

History

Formed by Decree of the Presidium of the Supreme Soviet of the USSR of February 6, 1943. The region included 32 districts of the eastern part of the Chelyabinsk region and 4 districts of the Omsk region with a total population of 975,000.
 	
Recipient of the Order of Lenin (1959).

Geography
Kurgan Oblast is located in Southern Russia and is part of the Urals Federal District. It shares borders with Chelyabinsk Oblast to the west, Sverdlovsk Oblast to the north-west, Tyumen Oblast to the north-east, and Kazakhstan (Kostanay and North Kazakhstan Region) to the south.

Climate
The oblast has a severe continental climate with long cold winters and warm summers with regular droughts.

Politics

During the Soviet period, the high authority in the oblast was shared between three persons: The first secretary of the Kurgan CPSU Committee (who in reality had the biggest authority), the chairman of the oblast Soviet (legislative power), and the Chairman of the oblast Executive Committee (executive power). Since 1991, CPSU lost all the power, and the head of the Oblast administration, and eventually the governor was appointed/elected alongside elected regional parliament.

The Charter of Kurgan Oblast is the fundamental law of the region. The Kurgan Oblast Duma is the province's standing legislative (representative) body. The Oblast Duma consists of 34 members and exercises its authority by passing laws, resolutions, and other legal acts and by supervising the implementation and observance of the laws and other legal acts passed by it. The highest executive body is the Oblast Government, which includes territorial executive bodies such as district administrations, committees, and commissions that facilitate development and run the day to day matters of the province. The Oblast administration supports the activities of the Governor who is the highest official and acts as guarantor of the observance of the oblast Charter in accordance with the Constitution of Russia.

After the last elections held in 2015 the United Russia Party currently holds the majority of seats in the Oblast Duma. Elections of deputies of the Kurgan Regional Duma of the VII convocation are scheduled for 2020.

Administrative divisions

Economy

Kurgan Oblast borders on the oil- and gas-bearing districts of Tyumen Oblast and is also close to similar districts in Tomsk Oblast. Large oil and gas pipelines pass through its territory, and Ural and Siberian oil refineries are fairly close. The main industrial centers are Kurgan, and Shadrinsk.

The oblast does not have large economic mineral reserves; therefore, it has developed mainly on the basis of subindustries associated with processing of agricultural production and assembly and packaging of finished products. The food industry is well developed here, with meat-packing plants, mills, creameries, and powdered milk factories.

Modern large-scale industry began developing during World War II, when sixteen enterprises from western regions of the country were evacuated here in 1941–1942.

Demographics
Population: 834,701 (2019 estimation), 

Russians (823,722) are the largest ethnic group in the Kurgan Oblast, making up 92.5% of the population. Other prominent ethnic groups in the oblast include Tatars (17,017) at 1.9%, Bashkirs (12,257) at 1.4%, Kazakhs (11,939) 1.3%, and Ukrainians (7,080) at 0.8%. Other ethnicities are 2.1%. Additionally, 20,017 people were registered from administrative databases, and could not declare an ethnicity. It is estimated that the proportion of ethnicities in this group is the same as that of the declared group.

Births (2010): 11,862 (13.0 per 1000)
Deaths (2010): 14,590 (16.0 per 1000)

Settlements

Total fertility rate:
2000 - 1.38
2001 - 1.35
2002 - 1.45
2003 - 1.40
2004 - 1.46
2005 - 1.40
2006 - 1.43
2007 - 1.59
2008 - 1.72
2009 - 1.77
2010 - 1.79
2011 - 1.82
2012 - 2.03
2013 - 2.12
2014 - 2.10
2015 - 2.12
2016 - 2.02(e)

Vital statistics for 2012
Births: 12 400 (13.8 per 1000)
Deaths: 14 216 (15.9 per 1000) 
Total fertility rate: 2.03

Religion

According to a 2012 survey 28.4% of the population of Kurgan Oblast adheres to the Russian Orthodox Church, 6% are nondenominational Christians (with the exclusion of such-defined Protestant churches), 2% are adherents of Islam, 1% are adherents of the Slavic native faith (Rodnovery), and 0.4% are adherents of forms of Hinduism (Vedism, Krishnaism or Tantrism). In addition, 36% of the population declares to be "spiritual but not religious", 14% is atheist, and 12.2% follows other religions or did not give an answer to the question.

Notable people

Yuri Balashov (born March 12, 1949), chess grandmaster
Oleg Bogomolov (born October 4, 1950), former Governor of Kurgan Oblast
Fyodor Bronnikov (1827–1902), painter
Dmitri Bushmanov (born September 30, 1978), association football player
Aleksandr Cherepanov (November 21, 1895 – July 6, 1984), lieutenant-general
Dumitru Diacov (born February 10, 1952), Moldovan politician
Viktor Dubynin (February 1, 1943 – November 22, 1992), Army General
Maxim Fadeev (born May 6, 1968), singer-songwriter, composer and producer
Pavel Fitin (December 28, 1907 – December 24, 1971), director of Soviet intelligence
Filipp Golikov (July 30, 1900 – July 29, 1980), Marshal of the Soviet Union
Sergey Gritsevets (July 19, 1909 – September 16, 1939), major, pilot and twice recipient of the honorary title of Hero of the Soviet Union.
Gavriil Ilizarov (June 15, 1921 – July 24, 1992), physician
Vyacheslav Kamoltsev (born December 14, 1971), association football player
Svetlana Kapanina (born December 22, 1968), aerobatic pilot
Anatoly Karelin (July 16, 1922 – January 3, 1974), Major General of aviation
Leonid Khabarov (born May 8, 1947), Colonel
Larisa Korobeynikova (born March 26, 1987), fencer
Evgeni Krasilnikov (born April 7, 1965), volleyball player
Leonid Krasin (July 3 (15), 1870 – November 24, 1926), politician and diplomat
Ivan Kurpishev (born March 2, 1969), powerlifter
Dmitri Loskov (born February 12, 1974), association football player
Aleksey Merzlyakov (March 22, 1778 - August 7, 1830), poet, critic, translator, and professor
Yana Romanova (born May 11, 1983), biathlete
Sergei Rublevsky (born October 15, 1974), chess grandmaster
Mikhail Ryumin (September 1, 1913 – July 22, 1954), Deputy Head of the Ministry for State Security (Soviet Union)
Yulia Savicheva (born 14 February 1987), singer
Ivan Shadr (February 11, 1887 – April 3, 1941), sculptor and medalist
Alexander Solonik (October 16, 1960 – January 31, 1997), hitman
Elena Temnikova (born April 18, 1985), singer
Alla Vazhenina (born May 29, 1983), weightlifter
Aleksandr Vinogradov (September 9, 1930 – June 14, 2011),  journalist and writer
Sergei Vinogradov (April 16, 1958 – December 16, 2010), journalist, translator and writer
Kirill A. Yevstigneyev (February 17, 1917 – August 29, 1996), Major General of aviation

References

Notes

Sources

External links

Official website of the Oblast Duma  
News portal 

 
States and territories established in 1943
Recipients of the Order of Lenin